Andrea Testa is an Italian paracanoeist who has competed since the late 2000s. He won a silver medal in the K-1 200 m LTA event at the 2010 ICF Canoe Sprint World Championships in Poznań.

References
 2010 ICF Canoe Sprint World Championships men's K-1 200 m LTA results. - accessed 20 August 2010.

Year of birth missing (living people)
Living people
Italian male canoeists
Paracanoeists of Italy
LTA classification paracanoeists
ICF Canoe Sprint World Championships medalists in paracanoe
21st-century Italian people